The inaugural season of the International Fight League (IFL) started in 2006 and was split into two halves.

Season

First Season
The first half of the season consisted of two events and only four teams (New York Pitbulls, Los Angeles Anacondas, Quad City Silverbacks, and Seattle Tiger Sharks). The Pat Miletich lead Quad City Silverbacks won the first Championship event defeating the Maurice Smith led Seattle Tiger Sharks on June 3, 2006.

Second Season
The Second half of the 2006 season saw the addition of four new teams to the IFL (Toronto Dragons, Tokyo Sabres, Portland Wolfpack and San Jose Razorclaws). The championship event was held at the end of the year between defending champions, Quad City Silverbacks and newcomers Portland Wolfpack with the Silverbacks capturing their second consecutive team championship.

Each event in the 2006 season had at least one superfight along with the team format matches.

Results

Events

IFL: Legends Championship 2006

IFL: Legends Championship 2006 took place on April 29, 2006 at the Trump Taj Mahal in Atlantic City, New Jersey.

Results

IFL: Championship 2006

IFL: Championship 2006 took place on June 3, 2006 at the Trump Taj Mahal in Atlantic City, New Jersey.

Results

References

External links
IFL - Official Website
2006 Results

International Fight League
International Fight League, 2006
Mixed martial arts in the United States
Events in Moline, Illinois
Events in Atlantic City, New Jersey
Events in Portland, Oregon
Events in Uncasville, Connecticut